Chymia was an annual peer-reviewed academic journal published in 12 volumes from 1948 to 1967. In 1947 a committee chaired by Charles Albert Browne Jr. and consisting of four other members, Claude K. Deischer, Rudolf Hirsch, Herbert S. Klickstein, and Henry M. Leicester, established the journal. The first issue was published in 1948 with Tenney L. Davis (1890–1949) as editor-in-chief. Almost all of the articles were in English, but with a few in French or German.

In 1969 Chymia was incorporated into the new journal Historical Studies in the Physical Sciences established by Russell McCormmach.

References

American Chemical Society academic journals
Annual journals
History of science journals
Publications established in 1948
Publications disestablished in 1968
Defunct journals
Multilingual journals